Brown (formerly, Siding 18, Front, and Mount Owen) is an unincorporated community in Kern County, California.

The Brown post office opened in 1909, changed its name to Mount Owen in 1948, and closed in 1950. The community was originally called Siding 18 because the place was along the railroad built to support construction of the Owens Valley aqueduct. The name Brown honors George Brown, hotelier.

References

Unincorporated communities in Kern County, California
Unincorporated communities in California